The Big Read was a survey on books carried out by the BBC in the United Kingdom in 2003, where over three-quarters of a million votes were received from the British public to find the nation's best-loved novel of all time. The year-long survey was the biggest single test of public reading taste to date, and culminated with several programmes hosted by celebrities, advocating their favourite books.

Purpose

The BBC started the Big Read with the goal of finding the "Nation's Best-loved Novel" by way of a viewer vote via the Web, SMS, and telephone. The show attracted controversy for adopting an allegedly sensationalist approach to literature, but supporters praised it for raising the public awareness of reading. The British public voted originally for any novel that they wished. From this, a list of 200 was drawn up, with the highest 21 then put forward for further voting, on the provision that only one book per author was permitted in the top 21. As the poll was based on novels, the plays of William Shakespeare were not part of the survey.

Top 200 novels in the United Kingdom

 The Lord of the Rings by J. R. R. Tolkien
 Pride and Prejudice by Jane Austen
 His Dark Materials by Philip Pullman
 The Hitchhiker's Guide to the Galaxy by Douglas Adams
 Harry Potter and the Goblet of Fire by J. K. Rowling
 To Kill a Mockingbird by Harper Lee
 Winnie-the-Pooh by A. A. Milne
 Nineteen Eighty-Four by George Orwell
 The Lion, the Witch and the Wardrobe by C. S. Lewis
 Jane Eyre by Charlotte Brontë
 Catch-22 by Joseph Heller
 Wuthering Heights by Emily Brontë
 Birdsong by Sebastian Faulks
 Rebecca by Daphne du Maurier
 The Catcher in the Rye by J. D. Salinger
 The Wind in the Willows by Kenneth Grahame
 Great Expectations by Charles Dickens
 Little Women by Louisa May Alcott
 Captain Corelli's Mandolin by Louis de Bernières
 War and Peace by Leo Tolstoy
 Gone with the Wind by Margaret Mitchell
 Harry Potter and the Philosopher's Stone by J. K. Rowling
 Harry Potter and the Chamber of Secrets by J. K. Rowling
 Harry Potter and the Prisoner of Azkaban by J. K. Rowling
 The Hobbit by J. R. R. Tolkien
 Tess of the d'Urbervilles by Thomas Hardy
 Middlemarch by George Eliot
 A Prayer for Owen Meany by John Irving
 The Grapes of Wrath by John Steinbeck
 Alice's Adventures in Wonderland by Lewis Carroll
 The Story of Tracy Beaker by Jacqueline Wilson
 One Hundred Years of Solitude by Gabriel García Márquez
 The Pillars of the Earth by Ken Follett
 David Copperfield by Charles Dickens
 Charlie and the Chocolate Factory by Roald Dahl
 Treasure Island by Robert Louis Stevenson
 A Town Like Alice by Nevil Shute
 Persuasion by Jane Austen
 Dune by Frank Herbert
 Emma by Jane Austen
 Anne of Green Gables by Lucy Maud Montgomery
 Watership Down by Richard Adams
 The Great Gatsby by F. Scott Fitzgerald
 The Count of Monte Cristo by Alexandre Dumas
 Brideshead Revisited by Evelyn Waugh
 Animal Farm by George Orwell
 A Christmas Carol by Charles Dickens
 Far from the Madding Crowd by Thomas Hardy
 Goodnight Mister Tom by Michelle Magorian
 The Shell Seekers by Rosamunde Pilcher
 The Secret Garden by Frances Hodgson Burnett
 Of Mice and Men by John Steinbeck
 The Stand by Stephen King
 Anna Karenina by Leo Tolstoy
 A Suitable Boy by Vikram Seth
 The BFG by Roald Dahl
 Swallows and Amazons by Arthur Ransome
 Black Beauty by Anna Sewell
 Artemis Fowl by Eoin Colfer
 Crime and Punishment by Fyodor Dostoyevsky
 Noughts & Crosses by Malorie Blackman
 Memoirs of a Geisha by Arthur Golden
 A Tale of Two Cities by Charles Dickens
 The Thorn Birds by Colleen McCullough
 Mort by Terry Pratchett
 The Magic Faraway Tree by Enid Blyton
 The Magus by John Fowles
 Good Omens by Neil Gaiman and Terry Pratchett
 Guards! Guards! by Terry Pratchett
 Lord of the Flies by William Golding
 Perfume by Patrick Süskind
 The Ragged-Trousered Philanthropists by Robert Tressell
 Night Watch by Terry Pratchett
 Matilda by Roald Dahl
 Bridget Jones's Diary by Helen Fielding
 The Secret History by Donna Tartt
 The Woman in White by Wilkie Collins
 Ulysses by James Joyce
 Bleak House by Charles Dickens
 Double Act by Jacqueline Wilson
 The Twits by Roald Dahl
 I Capture the Castle by Dodie Smith
 Holes by Louis Sachar
 Gormenghast by Mervyn Peake
 The God of Small Things by Arundhati Roy
 Vicky Angel by Jacqueline Wilson
 Brave New World by Aldous Huxley
 Cold Comfort Farm by Stella Gibbons
 Magician by Raymond E. Feist
 On the Road by Jack Kerouac
 The Godfather by Mario Puzo
 The Clan of the Cave Bear by Jean M. Auel
 The Colour of Magic by Terry Pratchett
 The Alchemist by Paulo Coelho
 Katherine by Anya Seton
 Kane and Abel by Jeffrey Archer
 Love in the Time of Cholera by Gabriel García Márquez
 Girls in Love by Jacqueline Wilson
 The Princess Diaries by Meg Cabot
 Midnight's Children by Salman Rushdie
 Three Men in a Boat by Jerome K. Jerome
 Small Gods by Terry Pratchett
 The Beach by Alex Garland
 Dracula by Bram Stoker
 Point Blanc by Anthony Horowitz
 The Pickwick Papers by Charles Dickens
 Stormbreaker by Anthony Horowitz
 The Wasp Factory by Iain Banks
 The Day of the Jackal by Frederick Forsyth
 The Illustrated Mum by Jacqueline Wilson
 Jude the Obscure by Thomas Hardy
 The Secret Diary of Adrian Mole, Aged 13¾ by Sue Townsend
 The Cruel Sea by Nicholas Monsarrat
 Les Misérables by Victor Hugo
 The Mayor of Casterbridge by Thomas Hardy
 The Dare Game by Jacqueline Wilson
 Bad Girls by Jacqueline Wilson
 The Picture of Dorian Gray by Oscar Wilde
 Shōgun by James Clavell
 The Day of the Triffids by John Wyndham
 Lola Rose by Jacqueline Wilson
 Vanity Fair by William Makepeace Thackeray
 The Forsyte Saga by John Galsworthy
 House of Leaves by Mark Z. Danielewski
 The Poisonwood Bible by Barbara Kingsolver
 Reaper Man by Terry Pratchett
 Angus, Thongs and Full-Frontal Snogging by Louise Rennison
 The Hound of the Baskervilles by Arthur Conan Doyle
 Possession: A Romance by A. S. Byatt
 The Master and Margarita by Mikhail Bulgakov
 The Handmaid's Tale by Margaret Atwood
 Danny, the Champion of the World by Roald Dahl
 East of Eden by John Steinbeck
 George's Marvellous Medicine by Roald Dahl
 Wyrd Sisters by Terry Pratchett
 The Color Purple by Alice Walker
 Hogfather by Terry Pratchett
 The Thirty-Nine Steps by John Buchan
 Girls in Tears by Jacqueline Wilson
 Sleepovers by Jacqueline Wilson
 All Quiet on the Western Front by Erich Maria Remarque
 Behind the Scenes at the Museum by Kate Atkinson
 High Fidelity by Nick Hornby
 It by Stephen King
 James and the Giant Peach by Roald Dahl
 The Green Mile by Stephen King
 Papillon by Henri Charrière
 Men at Arms by Terry Pratchett
 Master and Commander by Patrick O'Brian
 Skeleton Key by Anthony Horowitz
 Soul Music by Terry Pratchett
 Thief of Time by Terry Pratchett
 The Fifth Elephant by Terry Pratchett
 Atonement by Ian McEwan
 Secrets by Jacqueline Wilson
 The Silver Sword by Ian Serraillier
 One Flew Over the Cuckoo's Nest by Ken Kesey
 Heart of Darkness by Joseph Conrad
 Kim by Rudyard Kipling
 Cross Stitch by Diana Gabaldon
 Moby-Dick by Herman Melville
 River God by Wilbur Smith
 Sunset Song by Lewis Grassic Gibbon
 The Shipping News by E. Annie Proulx
 The World According to Garp by John Irving
 Lorna Doone by R. D. Blackmore
 Girls Out Late by Jacqueline Wilson
 The Far Pavilions by M. M. Kaye
 The Witches by Roald Dahl
 Charlotte's Web by E. B. White
 Frankenstein by Mary Shelley
 They Used to Play on Grass by Terry Venables and Gordon Williams
 The Old Man and the Sea by Ernest Hemingway
 The Name of the Rose by Umberto Eco
 Sophie's World by Jostein Gaarder
 Dustbin Baby by Jacqueline Wilson
 Fantastic Mr Fox by Roald Dahl
 Lolita by Vladimir Nabokov
 Jonathan Livingston Seagull by Richard Bach
 The Little Prince by Antoine de Saint-Exupéry
 The Suitcase Kid by Jacqueline Wilson
 Oliver Twist by Charles Dickens
 The Power of One by Bryce Courtenay
 Silas Marner by George Eliot
 American Psycho by Bret Easton Ellis
 The Diary of a Nobody by George and Weedon Grossmith
 Trainspotting by Irvine Welsh
 Goosebumps by R. L. Stine
 Heidi by Johanna Spyri
 Sons and Lovers by D. H. Lawrence
 The Unbearable Lightness of Being by Milan Kundera
 Man and Boy by Tony Parsons
 The Truth by Terry Pratchett
 The War of the Worlds by H. G. Wells
 The Horse Whisperer by Nicholas Evans
 A Fine Balance by Rohinton Mistry
 Witches Abroad by Terry Pratchett
 The Once and Future King by T. H. White
 The Very Hungry Caterpillar by Eric Carle
 Flowers in the Attic by V. C. Andrews

Authors with multiple novels on the list

Multiple novels in the Top 25
In the first stage, all four extant Harry Potter novels by J. K. Rowling were among the 25 leaders. So were both Middle-earth novels by J. R. R. Tolkien. The second stage featured 21 books by distinct authors: the top 25 with Rowling represented only by her fourth volume, Goblet of Fire, and Tolkien only by The Lord of the Rings. Those two novels finally placed fifth and first; the other preliminary leaders by Rowling and Tolkien nominally led the also-rans in ranks 22–25.

Multiple novels in the Top 50
 Four: J. K. Rowling
 Three: Jane Austen, Charles Dickens
 Two: Thomas Hardy, George Orwell, J. R. R. Tolkien

Multiple novels in the Top 100
 Five: Charles Dickens, Terry Pratchett
 Four: Roald Dahl, J. K. Rowling, Jacqueline Wilson
 Three: Jane Austen
 Two: Thomas Hardy, Gabriel García Márquez, George Orwell, John Steinbeck, J. R. R. Tolkien, Leo Tolstoy

Multiple novels in the Top 200
 Fifteen: Terry Pratchett
 Fourteen: Jacqueline Wilson
 Nine: Roald Dahl
 Seven: Charles Dickens
 Four: Thomas Hardy, J. K. Rowling
 Three: Jane Austen, Anthony Horowitz, Stephen King, John Steinbeck
 Two: George Eliot, John Irving, Gabriel García Márquez, George Orwell, J. R. R. Tolkien, Leo Tolstoy

Similar contests
Contests similar to the Big Read were conducted in other countries:
My Favourite Book in Australia
Das große Lesen in Germany
A Nagy Könyv ("The Big Book") in Hungary
Голямото четене ("The Big Read") in Bulgaria
Lielā Lasīšana ("The Big Read") in Latvia
The Great American Read

Other lists:
Le Mondes 100 Books of the Century

References

External links
BBC Big Read website

Book promotion
Literacy
British literary awards
Awards established in 2006
2006 establishments in the United Kingdom
Lists of novels
Top book lists
Literary awards by magazines and newspapers
BBC awards